Gethsemane is a garden in Jerusalem believed to be the place where Jesus and his disciples prayed the night before the crucifixion.

Gethsemane may also refer to:

Arts and entertainment
Gethsemane (oratorio), a 1998 chamber-oratorio by Matthew King
Gethsemane (play), a 2008 play by David Hare
"Gethsemane" (The X-Files), a 1997 television episode

Songs
"Gethsemane", by Conception from Flow, 1997
"Gethsemane", by Dry the River from Alarms in the Heart, 2014
"Gethsemane", by Nightwish from Oceanborn, 1998
"Gethsemane", by Om from Advaitic Songs, 2012
"Gethsemane", by Peter Gabriel from Passion, 1989
"Gethsemane", by Richard Thompson from The Old Kit Bag, 2003
"Gethsemane", by Rise Against from The Unraveling, 2005 reissue
"Gethsemane (I Only Want to Say)", from the musical Jesus Christ Superstar, 1971

Religious buildings
Abbey of Our Lady of Gethsemani, near Bardstown, Kentucky, US
Gethsemane Episcopal Church (disambiguation)
Gethsemane Evangelical Church, Berlin, Germany
Gethsemane Evangelical Lutheran Church, Detroit, Michigan, US
Gethsemane Lutheran Church, Austin, Texas, US

Other uses
Gethsemane Cemetery, in Bergen County, New Jersey, US
Gethsemane Man-made Forest, a conservation project in Assam, India

See also
Agony in the Garden, the Gethsemane episode in the life of Jesus
Agony in the Garden (disambiguation), depictions of the Gethsemane episode in art